Cricket is the most popular summer sport in New Zealand, second only in total sporting popularity to rugby. New Zealand is one of the twelve countries that take part in Test match cricket.

History

The beginnings of cricket in New Zealand

The Reverend Henry Williams provided history with the first report of a game of cricket in New Zealand when he wrote in his diary in December 1832 about boys in and around Paihia on Horotutu Beach playing cricket. In 1835, Charles Darwin and  called into the Bay of Islands on its epic circumnavigation of the Earth and Darwin witnessed a game of cricket played by freed Māori slaves and the son of a missionary at Waimate North. Darwin in The Voyage of the Beagle wrote:

several young men redeemed by the missionaires from slavery were employed on the farm. In the evening I saw a party of them at cricket.

The first recorded game of cricket in New Zealand took place in Wellington in December 1842. The Wellington Spectator reports a game on 28 December 1842 played by a "Red" team and a "Blue" team from the Wellington Club. The first fully recorded match was reported by the Examiner in Nelson between the Surveyors and Nelson in March 1844.

The first team to tour New Zealand was Parr's all England XI in 1863–64. Between 1864 and 1914, 22 foreign teams toured NZ. England sent 6 teams, Australia 15 and Fiji 1.

First national team

On 15–17 February 1894 the first team representing New Zealand played New South Wales at Lancaster Park in Christchurch. NSW won by 160 runs. New South Wales returned again in 1895–96 and NZ won the solitary game by 142 runs, its first victory. The New Zealand Cricket Council was formed towards the end of 1894.

New Zealand played its first two internationals (not Tests) in 1904–05 against a star-studded Australia team containing such players as Victor Trumper, Warwick Armstrong and Clem Hill. Rain saved NZ from a thrashing in the first match but not the second which NZ lost by an innings and 358 runs – currently the second largest defeat in NZ first-class cricket.

Inter-war period

In 1927 NZ toured England. They played 26 first class matches, mostly against county sides. They managed to beat Worcestershire, Glamorgan, Somerset, and Derbyshire. On the strength of the performances on this tour NZ was granted Test status.

In 1929/30 the M.C.C toured NZ and played 4 Tests all of 3 days in duration. NZ lost its first Test match but drew the next 3. In the second Test Stewie Dempster and Jackie Mills put on 276 for the first wicket. This is still the highest partnership for New Zealand against England.

NZ first played South Africa in 1931–32 but were unable to secure Test matches against any teams other than England before World War II ended all Test cricket for 7 years. NZ's first Test after the war was against Australia in 1945/46. This game was not considered a "Test" at the time but it was granted Test status retrospectively by the International Cricket Council in March 1948. The NZ players who appeared in this match probably did not appreciate this move by the ICC as NZ were dismissed for 42 and 54. The New Zealand Cricket Council's unwillingness to pay Australian players a decent allowance to tour NZ ensured that this was the only Test Australia played against NZ between 1929 and 1972.

Cricket after World War II

In 1949 NZ sent one of its best ever sides to England. It contained Bert Sutcliffe, Martin Donnelly, John R. Reid and Jack Cowie. However, 3-day Test matches ensured that all 4 Tests were drawn.

NZ played its first matches against the West Indies in 1951–52, and Pakistan and India in 1955/56.

In 1954/55 NZ recorded the lowest ever innings total, 26 against England. The following season NZ achieved its first Test victory. The first 3 Tests of a 4 Test series were won easily by the West Indies but NZ won the fourth to notch up its first Test victory. It had taken them 45 matches and 26 years. In the next 20 years NZ won only 7 more Tests. For most of this period NZ lacked a class bowler to lead their attack although they had 2 excellent batsmen in Glenn Turner and Bert Sutcliffe and a great all-rounder in John R. Reid.

1970–71 to 2000 

In 1973 Richard Hadlee debuted and the rate at which NZ won Tests picked up dramatically. Hadlee was one of the best pace bowlers of his generation and played 86 Tests for NZ before he retired in 1990. Of the 86 Tests that Hadlee played in New Zealand won 22 and lost 28. In 1977/78 NZ won its first Test against England, at the 48th attempt. Hadlee took 10 wickets in the match.

During the 1980s NZ also had the services of one of its best ever batsman, Martin Crowe and a number of good players such as John Wright, Bruce Edgar, John F. Reid, Andrew Jones, Geoff Howarth, Jeremy Coney, Ian Smith, John Bracewell, Lance Cairns, Stephen Boock, and Ewen Chatfield, who were capable of playing the occasional match winning performance and consistently making a valuable contribution to a Test match.

The best example of NZ's two star players (R. Hadlee and M. Crowe) putting in match winning performances and other players making good contributions is NZ v Australia, 1985 at Brisbane. In Australia's first innings Hadlee took 9–52. In NZ's only innings, M Crowe scored 188 and John F. Reid 108. Edgar, Wright, Coney, Jeff Crowe, V. Brown, and Hadlee scored between 17 and 54*. In Australia's second innings, Hadlee took 6–71 and Chatfield 3–75. NZ won by an innings and 41 runs.

One-day cricket also gave NZ a chance to compete more regularly than Test cricket with the better sides in world cricket. In one-day cricket a batsman doesn't need to score centuries to win games for his side and bowlers don't need to bowl the opposition out. One-day games can be won by one batsman getting a 50, a few others getting 30s, bowlers bowling economically and everyone fielding well. These were requirements New Zealand players could consistently meet and thus developed a good one-day record against all sides.

Perhaps New Zealand's most famous one-day match was the infamous "Under arm" match against Australia at the MCG in 1981. Requiring six runs to tie the match off the final ball, Australian captain Greg Chappell instructed his brother Trevor to "bowl" the ball underarm along the wicket to prevent the New Zealand batsman from hitting a six. The Australian umpires ruled the move as legal even though to this day many believe it was one of the most unsporting decisions made in cricket.

When New Zealand next played in the tri-series in Australia in 1983, Lance Cairns became a cult hero for his one-day batting. In one match against Australia, he hit six sixes at the MCG, one of the world's largest grounds. Few fans remember that NZ lost this game by 149 runs. However, Lance's greatest contribution to NZ cricket was his son Chris Cairns.

Into the 21st Century

Chris Cairns made his debut one year before Hadlee retired in 1990. Cairns, one of New Zealand's best allrounders, led the 1990s bowling attack with Danny Morrison. Stephen Fleming, NZ's most prolific scorer, led the batting and the team into the 21st century. Nathan Astle and Craig McMillan also scored plenty of runs for New Zealand, but both retired earlier than expected.

Daniel Vettori made his debut as an 18-year-old in 1997, and when he took over from Fleming as captain in 2007 he was regarded as the best spinning allrounder in world cricket. On 26 August 2009, Daniel Vettori became the eighth player and second left-arm bowler (after Chaminda Vaas) in history to take 300 wickets and score 3000 test runs, joining the illustrious club. Vettori decided to take an indefinite break from international short form cricket in 2011 but will continue to represent New Zealand in Test cricket.

Shane Bond played 17 Tests for NZ between 2001 and 2007 but missed far more through injury. When fit, he added a dimension to the NZ bowling attack that had been missing since Hadlee retired.

The rise of the financial power of the BCCI had an immense effect on NZ cricket and its players. The BCCI managed to convince other boards not to pick players who had joined the rival Twenty-20 Indian Cricket League. NZ Cricket lost the services of Shane Bond, Lou Vincent, Andre Adams, Hamish Marshall and Daryl Tuffey. The money to be made from Twenty-20 cricket in India may have also induced players, such as Craig McMillan and Scott Styris (from Test cricket) to retire earlier than they would have otherwise. After the demise of the Indian Cricket League, Bond and Tuffey again played for NZ.

Governing body

New Zealand Cricket, formerly the New Zealand Cricket Board, is the governing body for professional cricket in New Zealand. Cricket is the most popular and highest profile summer sport in New Zealand.

Domestic competitions

New Zealand Cricket operates the New Zealand cricket team, organising Test tours, One Day Internationals and Twenty20 with other nations. It also organises domestic cricket in New Zealand, including the Plunket Shield (First-class), The Ford Trophy men's domestic one-day competition, the Hallyburton Johnstone Shield women's domestic one-day competition, as well as the Men's Super Smash and Women's Super Smash domestic Twenty20 competitions.

Men's Teams
New Zealand Cricket involves the following men's domestic teams:
 Auckland Aces
 Canterbury (known as Canterbury Kings for Twenty20)
 Central Stags
 Northern Districts (known as Northern Brave for Twenty20)
 Otago Volts
 Wellington Firebirds

Women's Teams
New Zealand Cricket involves the following women's domestic teams:
 Auckland Hearts
 Canterbury Magicians
 Central Hinds
 Northern Districts (known as Northern Brave for Twenty20)
 Otago Sparks
 Wellington Blaze

First World Cup
The Cricket World Cup is an international cricket championship that is played every four years and is one of the most popular sporting events in the world. 

The first Cricket World Cup was played in England in 1975 and consisted of a number of one-day matches of 60 overs each. In 1987, it was first held outside of England in India and Pakistan. Additionally, the number of overs per side was decreased to 50 for the 1987 match. Australia became the first team to win three straight World Cup competitions in 2007.

Grounds

There are numerous club grounds throughout New Zealand. Over 70 grounds have been used for First-class, List A and Twenty20 cricket matches.

The 16 grounds that have hosted men's international cricket games are listed in the table below.

As of 29 December 2021.

National team

Men's team

New Zealand is the current holder of the ICC World Test Championship title. New zealand lifted the 'Mace' in 2021 defeating India by 8 wickets in the final played at Lord's cricket ground. In the same year new zealand ended up as the runner up of ICC World Twenty20 Cricket World Cup.

Historically, the national cricket team has not been as successful as the national rugby union team. New Zealand played its first test in 1930 but had to wait until 1956 to win its first test. The national team began to have more success in the 1970s and 1980s. New Zealand's most famous cricketer, the fast bowler Richard Hadlee who was the first bowler to take 400 wickets in test cricket, played in this era.

Although traditionally New Zealand is one of the stronger sides in Cricket, they have only progressed past the semi-finals of the Cricket World Cup twice as runners up both in 2015 and 2019, but got caught short six times, the semi-finals of the Commonwealth Games and the semi-finals of the Pro20 World Championship, however they have won ICC Champions Trophy back in year 2000. Also New Zealand's Woman's Cricket Team has reached the World Cup finals.

Women's team

The New Zealand women's cricket team played their first Test match in 1935, when they lost to England. Since then they have only won two Tests, once against Australia, and once against South Africa.

Their greatest success in one-day cricket was when they won the 2000 World Cup under captain Emily Drumm. In a hotly contested final, they scored 184 to narrowly beat Australia by four runs, Australia being all out for 180.

Cricket development

New Zealand Cricket has established High Performance Cricket training centre based at Lincoln University. It also operates a grassroots development programme for school children called 'MILO Kiwi Cricket' . John Wright, former NZ opening batsman, was appointed acting high performance manager for NZC in November 2007.

New Zealand has many private cricket academies and the Bracewell Cricket Academy based at Rathkeale College is one of the largest cricket academies, providing an Overseas Cricket Development Programme, a Pre-Season Coaching Camp, a Festival of Cricket.

There are around 170,000 registered cricketers in New Zealand and is steadily increasing. By way of comparison, Australia has 1.3 million and the UK around 500,000.
According to Mark O'Neill, New Zealand's batting coach from 2007 to 2009, the competition at club level in NZ is nowhere near as intense as in Australia.
"In Sydney there are 20 first grade teams, each club has five grades. To get to first grade you've got to be a friggin' good player and once you get there the competition is very, very fierce. Unfortunately it's not the same standard [in NZ]. Competition is everything and the only way the New Zealand guys are going to get that is to play the world's best players."

Funding

New Zealand Cricket derives most of its revenue from the sale of 2 types of broadcasting rights.

 Broadcasting rights to home internationals.
 A share of the broadcasting rights the ICC sells to its tournaments, such as the World Cup.

Host nations pick up all the expenses of touring teams, but get sole access to all broadcast rights and gate receipts.

In November 2007 it was announced that NZC had made a 5-year deal for the broadcasting rights to home internationals for NZ$65.4m with Sony Entertainment Television. The previous four-year deal between NZC and ESPN-Star was for only NZ$14.4m. Part of the 5-fold increase in value is due to the Indian team's tour of NZ in 2009.

Immediately prior to the 2009 Indian tour of NZ the Sunday Star-Times reported that "NZ Cricket hits $25m jackpot".

The article claimed that NZ Cricket will get $1 million for each of the 22 days the Indians take the field and that NZ Cricket had insured against loss of income for the sale of TV rights due to bad weather. NZC boss Justin Vaughan also said that a tour by India generates "many times" more income than tours by Australia, South Africa and England and that the Indian tour was worth more to NZC than the payout from the Cricket World Cup, which was around $20m.

The article also states that over the past two years, NZC's income has been around $30m, but this year (2009) Vaughan is hoping to get more than $40 million from broadcast rights, sponsorship and ticket sales.

In 2007, the ICC sold the rights to broadcast the World Cup, the Champions Trophy and the ICC World Twenty20 to ESPN Star Sports until 2015 for US$1 billion. NZC will receive a slice of that.

In November 2017, Star Sports acquired the broadcast and digital rights for New Zealand Cricket for all men's and women's international matches being organised in the country till April 2020 for the Indian subcontinent and Southeast Asia.

Player income

Twenty five percent of NZC's revenue goes to pay player salaries.

In 2016 Kane Williamson, the top-ranked cricketer, earned NZ$205,266 as a basic retainer. This figure decreased in increments of $6000 and the 21st ranked player received $85,585. Kane Williamson also got a $40,000 captains fee. Players receive NZ$8,495 per test, NZ$3,682 per one-day international and NZ$2,407 for a Twenty20 international. On average, they play 10 tests, 25–30 one-day games and around 10 Twenty20 matches a year. There is also prize money for winning games.

Players such as Williamson, Trent Boult and Tim Southee will play in virtually all of NZ's matches. So the top four or five players get between $300,000 and $400,000 from New Zealand Cricket, the next five or six between $180,000 and $300,000.

As a result of the new 5-year deal and IPL income, top NZ cricketers are earning more than the All Blacks.
Top-tier NZRU players are paid around NZ$500,000 per year by the NZRU.
In 2009, Dan Carter, the most valuable New Zealand rugby player, was estimated to earn between $700,000 and $900,000 a year (including endorsements). McCullum, the highest paid cricketer, was estimated to be earning between $1 million and $1.5 million yearly, which included IPL payments. By 2014 and even more so by 2016, cricketers were dropping down the New Zealand Herald sporting rich list as Rugby players and other sportsmen and women got more lucrative overseas contracts. Several New Zealand cricketers came in places 11–20 with earnings of $NZ800,000 to $1.1m.

"Banned" players

Former Black Caps Nathan Astle, Chris Harris, Craig McMillan, Hamish Marshall, Lou Vincent and Daryl Tuffey who played in the "rebel" Indian Cricket League were effectively "banned" from ever playing for NZ again.

Justin Vaughan former NZ Cricket CEO, perhaps with one eye on the legal ramifications, did not use the "b" word but preferred terms such as; "the selectors will be encouraged to consider other players", or "overlooked for selection". It also appeared that the players would not be able to hold a contract from their provinces but would be allowed to play on a game by game basis.

In January 2008 it was announced that Shane Bond had signed a US$800,000 a year contract to play for the ICL for 3 years. Bond's agent Leanne McGoldrick said that Bond intended to honour his contract with NZ cricket until May 2008. However, NZC decided to "overlook Bond for selection"  because all members of the International Cricket Council had agreed not to pick players who have signed for the rebel leagues. NZC did not want to jeopardise its relationship with the ICC, as it relies heavily on them for funding.

This put Bond and NZC in a precarious position, as prior to signing his ICL contract, he had been given permission to play in the ICL by NZC (believing they were not contravening ICC rules) while still able to play in New Zealand international games. Bond chose not to press the issue, deciding to play solely in the ICL.

In September 1977, Tony Greig, Mike Procter and John Snow with support from Kerry Packer contested the bans they had been subjected to by the TCCB for playing in World Series Cricket in the English high court. The court ruled that the bans were a restraint of trade and therefore illegal.

On 29 January 2008, the New Zealand Herald stated that Bond, who wants to play in the upcoming series against England, and NZ Cricket was released from his NZC contract and will not be chosen on a game-by-game basis. Bond appears to have given up on legal action for restraint of trade.

Heath Mills, the executive manager of the New Zealand Cricket Players Association (NZCPA), was not so conciliatory. He accused NZC of acting to appease the Indian board (BCCI). Mills described the ICC operating manual regulation that purports to not allow [ICC members] to release players to participate in non-sanctioned events as restraint of trade.

Mills also said :
"The NZCPA fully understands the position NZC has found itself and we do not want them to damage relationships with the BCCI and other ICC members. However, pressure to preserve these relationships should not be placed above preserving New Zealand's right to select its best players to represent the Black Caps, the rights and aspirations of New Zealand citizens to represent their country and the legal rights of players under their signed playing contracts.

Given the issues Bond has decided to stand aside from international cricket at NZC's request. The NZCPA supports this decision as it enables him to preserve a strong relationship with the board of NZC in the hope that he can again contribute to the game in New Zealand at some stage in the future. However, this is not a decision that he was compelled to make and under our contract system negotiated with NZC it remains open for any player to play for a third party like the ICL and still remain contracted to and play for NZC.

It is this situation that leaves the NZCPA concerned for cricket in New Zealand. We urge the ICC to step in and attempt to influence this situation and find a way to manage third party investment in our sport before we lose more players both here and around the world, and international cricket has been damaged further. History has shown that professional sports cannot afford to become split. It is absolutely vital that international cricket remains the pinnacle of the sport and that we ensure the best players are playing."

In any event, Bond himself has said that due to the risk of injury he no longer wants to play test cricket for NZ.

Due to the financial problems as a result of the 2008 'credit crunch', the ICL cancelled part of its schedule, and offered to release the New Zealand players from their contracts, some of whom had not been paid for several months.

Gallery

See also

Sport in New Zealand

References

External links
 New Zealand cricket
 BLACKCAPS official website
 Beige Brigade Official Website
 Cricinfo New Zealand
 A somewhat wacky site – Fun with the Black Caps
 Cricket database
 Runs on the board – New Zealand cricket (NZHistory)